The False Prince may refer to:

 The False Prince (novel), the first novel in the Ascendance Trilogy
 The False Prince (film), a 1927 German silent film